Barwy szczęścia is a Polish television soap opera that was premiered on September 27, 2007 on TVP2.

Cast

Current cast members

Former cast members

Series overview

References

External links
  
 

2000s Polish television series
2010s Polish television series
2020s Polish television series
2007 Polish television series debuts
Polish television soap operas
Television shows set in Warsaw
Telewizja Polska original programming